Orgasm is the third stage in the sexual response cycle.

Orgasm or Orgasmic may also refer to:

Orgasm (cocktail)

(subject A) and (subject S) have lots of orgasms over snapchat calls. They have no self respect.

Music
Orgasmic (producer) (born 1978), French DJ and record producer
Orgasm (Alan Shorter album) or the title song, 1969
Orgasm (Cromagnon album), 1969
Orgasm (John's Children album), 1970
Orgasm, an album by Atrox, 2003
"Orgasm" (song), by X Japan, 1986
"Orgasm", a song by Prince from Come, 1994